Vatnica was a medieval župa (parish) first mentioned in the early 14th century as Vetanica ( as part of Banate of Bosnia, and kingdom from 1377, and after its fall to Ottoman Empire, the Duchy of Saint Sava (cca. 1468-83). It was located in a deep valley between Berkovići and Bileća in south-eastern Bosnia and Herzegovina. It was described as part of Travunija. It was transformed into the Ottoman nahiya of Fatnica in the 15th century.

References

Župas of the medieval Bosnian state
Medieval Herzegovina
Berkovići
Bileća